Reginald Tate (September 14, 1954 – October 21, 2019) was an American politician and a Democratic member of the Tennessee Senate for the 33rd district, which encompasses part of Shelby County.

Education and career

Reginald Tate graduated with a Bachelor of Arts degree in Architectural Engineering from the University Of Memphis. He worked as an architect and was the President and CEO of Accent by Design. He served as the Vice Chairman of the Cocaine, Alcohol Awareness Program.

Public office

Reginald Tate was first elected to the state senate in 2006. He was the Vice Chair of the Senate Education Committee and Health Disparity Committee, and the Treasurer of both the Tennessee Legislative Black Caucus and the Shelby County Delegation. He was a member of the Senate Commerce, Labor and Agriculture Committee; the Joint Fiscal Review Committee; the Joint Fiscal Review Contract Services Subcommittee; Joint Business Tax Committee; the Joint Lottery Oversight Committee; the Cover TN Advisory Committee; the Special Joint Committee to Study Professional Boxing, Mixed Martial Arts, Wrestling, and Sparring; and the Special Joint Committee to Study Small Business Retention and Development. He also serves on the Shelby County Democratic Party Executive Committee.

In July 2018, Tate, who regularly voted with Republicans, was censured by the Shelby County Democratic Party for making derogatory comments about Democrats and for identifying himself as a Republican.

Tate ran for re-election in 2018 as State Senator but lost renomination in the Democratic primary to Katrina Robinson, who was endorsed by Minority Leader Lee Harris.

References

1954 births
2019 deaths
Democratic Party Tennessee state senators
University of Memphis alumni
21st-century American politicians
21st-century African-American politicians
African-American architects
African-American state legislators in Tennessee
Politicians from Memphis, Tennessee